Mount Croghan is a town in Chesterfield County, South Carolina, United States. The population was 195 at the 2010 census, up from 155 in 2000.

Geography
Mount Croghan is located in northern Chesterfield County at  (34.768720, -80.225217). South Carolina Highway 9 passes through the town, leading east  to Chesterfield, the county seat, and west  to Pageland. South Carolina Highway 109 leads north from Mount Croghan  to the North Carolina border, from where North Carolina Highway 109 leads northeast another  to Wadesboro. SC 109 joins SC 9 running east from Mount Croghan  to Ruby. South Carolina Highway 268 leads southwest from Mount Croghan  to Jefferson.

Demographics

As of the census of 2000, there were 155 people, 66 households, and 46 families residing in the town. The population density was 203.5 people per square mile (78.7/km2). There were 70 housing units at an average density of 91.9 per square mile (35.6/km2). The racial makeup of the town was 90.32% White and 9.68% African American.

There were 66 households, out of which 30.3% had children under the age of 18 living with them, 56.1% were married couples living together, 10.6% had a female householder with no husband present, and 28.8% were non-families. 28.8% of all households were made up of individuals, and 15.2% had someone living alone who was 65 years of age or older. The average household size was 2.35 and the average family size was 2.79.

In the town, the population was spread out, with 22.6% under the age of 18, 3.2% from 18 to 24, 27.1% from 25 to 44, 23.9% from 45 to 64, and 23.2% who were 65 years of age or older. The median age was 43 years. For every 100 females, there were 78.2 males. For every 100 females age 18 and over, there were 84.6 males.

The median income for a household in the town was $34,792, and the median income for a family was $36,875. Males had a median income of $30,625 versus $17,361 for females. The per capita income for the town was $14,880. About 2.6% of families and 3.8% of the population were below the poverty line, including none of those under the age of eighteen and 13.0% of those 65 or over.

References

External links
 Town of Mount Croghan official website

Towns in Chesterfield County, South Carolina
Towns in South Carolina